(January 24, 1977) is the lead guitarist and backing singer of the Japanese rock band Asian Kung-Fu Generation. Kensuke met fellow band members Masafumi Gotō and Takahiro Yamada while attending a music club of Kanto Gakuin University. The three formed Asian Kung-Fu Generation in 1996, with drummer Kiyoshi Ijichi joining the band shortly after.

While he primarily performs as background vocals, he's sung lead vocals on many b-sides, such as "Uso to Wonderland", "Seaside Sleeping", "Time Traveler", "Hakkei", "Weather Report", and "Omatsuri No Ato". He has a degree in economics and his favourite bands are Radiohead, Manic Street Preachers, XTC, Supergrass.

References

1977 births
Living people
Japanese rock guitarists
Japanese male rock singers
Asian Kung-Fu Generation members
Kanto Gakuin University alumni
20th-century Japanese guitarists
21st-century Japanese guitarists

Musicians from Kanagawa Prefecture